This is a list of Puerto Rico American Football League (PRAFL) seasons, including seasons in Puerto Rico football prior to the PRAFL's founding in 2014.

2010s
2014 PRAFL season | 2015 PRAFL season | 2016 PRAFL season

References